Les Parodi (born 4 January 1954) is an English retired professional football defender.

In 1978, he moved to the US, where he signed with the Seattle Sounders of the North American Soccer League. In 1979, he played for the Columbus Magic in the American Soccer League.

References

External links
Seattle Sounders player profile

American Soccer League (1933–1983) players
Columbus Magic players
English footballers
English expatriate footballers
English people of Italian descent
Association football defenders
North American Soccer League (1968–1984) players
Slough Town F.C. players
AFC Bournemouth players
Oxford City F.C. players
Seattle Sounders (1974–1983) players
1954 births
Living people
English Football League players
English expatriate sportspeople in the United States
Expatriate soccer players in the United States